Irvineia is a genus of schilbid catfishes native to Africa.

Species
There are currently two recognized species in this genus:
 Irvineia orientalis Trewavas, 1964
 Irvineia voltae Trewavas, 1943

I. orientalis originates from the Jubba-Shebelle system and grows to 50.2 cm (19.8 in) SL. I. voltae is endemic to the Volta River and grows to the 17.8 cm SL (7.0 in) SL. These fish are oviparous and do not guard their eggs.

References

Schilbeidae

Freshwater fish genera
Catfish genera
Taxa named by Ethelwynn Trewavas